Don Webster may refer to:
 Don Webster (ice hockey)
 Don Webster (media personality)